Gonçalo Nuno Borges Ferreira Gomes Alves (born 1 July 1977) is a Portuguese former futsal player who played as a winger and defender.

At club level, he most notably represented Benfica, with whom he won 18 major titles in 11 seasons – the last 6 years as team captain. On 8 October 2014, he retired from international duty as the most capped player of all time for the Portugal national team.

After ending his career as player, Alves became team manager of Benfica.

Honours
Benfica
Liga Portuguesa: 2006–07, 2007–08, 2008–09, 2011–12, 2014–15
Taça de Portugal: 2006–07, 2008–09, 2011–12, 2014–15, 2016–17
Supertaça de Portugal: 2006, 2007, 2009, 2011, 2012, 2015, 2016
UEFA Futsal Cup: 2009–10

References

External links
 
  (archive)

1977 births
Living people
Sportspeople from Lisbon
Futsal defenders
Futsal forwards
Portuguese men's futsal players
Sporting CP futsal players
S.L. Benfica futsal players